Phidiana anulifera is a species of sea slug, a nudibranch, a marine, gastropod mollusk in the family Facelinidae.

Distribution
This species was described from Sagami Bay, Japan. It is also known from Hong Kong.

References

Facelinidae
Gastropods described in 1949